Condensin-2 complex subunit G2 (CAP-G2) also known as chromosome-associated protein G2 (CAP-G2) or leucine zipper protein 5 (LUZP5) is a protein that in humans is encoded by the NCAPG2 gene. CAP-G2 is a subunit of condensin II, a large protein complex involved in chromosome condensation. It interacts with PLK1 through its C-terminal region during mitosis

Clinical importance

Mutations in this gene in humans have been associated with severe neurodevelopmental defects, failure to thrive, ocular abnormalities, and defects in urogenital and limb morphogenesis.

References

Further reading 

 
 

Human proteins